Policejní Volejbalový Klub Olymp Praha is a professional Czech women's volleyball club (until 1993 it also had a men's team) based in Prague and currently playing in the Czech Women's Volleyball Extraliga, the highest Czech league. During the Czechoslovakia era, the club was called Rudá Hvězda Praha and had its most successful period.

Previous names
The club have competed under the following names:
 Rudá Hvězda Praha (1953–1990)
 PSK Olymp Praha (1990–1994)
 PVK Olymp Praha (1994–present)

History

Background
Following the end of the Second World War in 1945, the Czechoslovakia military corps begin forming sports teams to keep the physical fitness of soldiers and soon regional and national competitions for these teams were created. In 1948 most sports were banned from being professional in the country, in that same year the army formed a club called Armádní tělovýchovný klub (ATK) Praha and by 1953 a law (following the Soviet model) determined that all clubs should be voluntary sports societies (Czech:  or ), with athletes being allocated to clubs according to their civic occupation. In that same year, ATK Praha becomes a DSO called  and the national security corps (until then part of the ATK Praha) formed a new DSO called .

Czechoslovak years
Originally, Rudá Hvězda had only a men's team which started competing in the local competition, progressing to the regional and arriving at the national competition in 1956. The men's team would remain in the highest national level until it was dissolved in 1993, with its most successful period happening between 1970 and 1990, having won the national championship nine times. The men's team also participated in European competitions, winning the 1977–78 Cup Winners Cup and finishing the CEV Champions League in the top four positions on three occasions (third in 1972–73 and fourth in both 1984–85 and 1985–86).

The women's team came to notoriety in the 1960s, arriving at the highest national level in 1969. The first titles came in 1973–74 (Czechoslovak championship and cup) with more success following in the 1970s and 1980s. The team also achieved international success by winning the CEV Women's Champions League twice (1975–76 and 1979–80) and reaching the Women's Cup Winners Cup final three times, winning in 1978–79 and finishing second in 1973–74 and 1982–83.

By the time the Czechoslovak championships came to an end, in 1992, the club had won a total of 21 national championship titles (12 women's and 9 men's).

Czech Republic years
After the dissolution of Czechoslovakia and the creation of the new Czech league in 1993, Olymp Praha decided to focus only on women's volleyball, changing from sports club (PSK) to volleyball club (Policejní volejbalový klub or PVK) in 1994. The club proved to be competitive in the league, having never been relegated (since 1969) and despite not being as dominant as during the Czechoslovak days, it achieved some degree of success, winning the league on four occasions and the cup eight times.

Honours

Men
National competitions
  Czechoslovak Championship: 9
1965–66, 1971–72, 1981–82, 1983–84, 1984–85, 1985–86, 1988–89, 1990–91, 1991–92

International competitions
  CEV Cup: 1
1977–78

Women
National competitions
  Czechoslovak Championship: 12
1973–74, 1974–75, 1976–77, 1978–79, 1979–80, 1980–81, 1983–84, 1984–85, 1985–86, 1986–87, 1987–88, 1991–92

  Czechoslovak Cup: 7
1973–74, 1975–76, 1976–77, 1977–78, 1978–79, 1979–80, 1981–82

  Czech League: 4
1996–97, 1998–99, 2004–05, 2007–08

  Czech Cup: 8
1995–96, 1996–97, 1997–98, 1998–99, 1999–00, 2003–04, 2004–05, 2006–07

International competitions
  CEV Champions League: 2
1975–76, 1979–80

  CEV Cup: 1
1978–79

Team
Season 2017–2018, as of December 2017.

References

External links
 Official site 

Czech volleyball clubs
Volleyball clubs established in 1953
1953 establishments in Czechoslovakia
Sport in Prague